Dobong Station is a metro station on Seoul Subway Line 1. It is in the extreme north of Seoul and offers services connecting the city to the cities to the north in Gyeonggi-do.

Exits
 Exit 1: Dobong 1-dong Office, Dobong 1-dong Post Office, Bukseoul Middle School, Suraksan, Gangbuk·Dobong Red Cross Service Center
 Exit 2: Chang-dong Armed Forces Hospital
 Exit 3: Dobong 1-dong Community Center, Dobong Market

References 

Seoul Metropolitan Subway stations
Metro stations in Dobong District
Railway stations opened in 1986